The Damestenen ("Stone of the Ladies" in English), also referred as Hesselagerstenen ("Large stone of Hesselager"), is a glacial erratic located near Svendborg, in the south-east of Fionia, Denmark.

Geography 

The boulder is the biggest glacial erratic in Denmark, followed by the Tirslund Rock. It stands close to the village of Hesselager, some 20 km northeast of Svendborg; located in a field, it can be reached by a country lane named Damestenensvej.

Features 
The Damestenen consists of a block of light grey granite dating back to the last Last Glacial Period. Its height is 12 m, the circumference is 46 m, and its weight is 1000 tons.

History 
The boulder is mentioned by the Danish theologian Erik Pontoppidan in his work titled Den Danske Atlas (1763–1781). In 1840, during Christian VIII's kingdom, the boulder was analysed by the geologist Johan Georg Forchhammer, who suggested to escavate around it in order to determine its size and to check if it was connected to undergroud bedrock. In 1843 the Damestenen was actually escavated on its northeast side.

A folk legend tells that it was thrown from the north of the Langeland island by a female giant aiming to destroy the spire of Svindinge's church, but in spite of the giant's strength the stone felt midway.

References

External links

Glacial erratics of Denmark